Woodside is a small village in Scotland,  from Perth, in the Perth and Kinross council area. It is joined onto another village, Burrelton.

The population of Woodside in 1971 was 160.

Woodside used to have a train station, part of the London, Midland and Scottish Railway. The station was known as the Woodside and Burrelton railway station. The Cargill-Burrelton parish church is also located in Woodside.

The village is also home to the local Scottish Amateur Football Association side Burrelton Rovers A.F.C, who play at the Recreation Ground.

Notable residents
John Swinney, current MSP, Scottish National Party

References

External links
 ED.ac.uk

Villages in Perth and Kinross

gd:Both Bhùirnich